Olivier Cauwenbergh (born 15 March 1987) is a Belgian sprint canoeist. Cauwenbergh is a member of Royal Canoe Club Mechelen, and thus is coached and trained by Carlos Prendes.

Cauwenbergh qualified for the men's K-2 1000 metres at the 2012 Summer Olympics in London, by finishing fourth from the 2011 ICF Canoe Sprint World Championships in Szeged, Hungary. Cauwenbergh and his partner Laurens Pannecoucke paddled to a second-place finish and tenth overall in the B-final by forty-seven hundredths of a second (0.47) behind the winning Danish pair Kim Wraae Knudsen and Emil Stær Simensen, posting their best Olympic time of 3:13.298. Three days later, the Belgian pair edged out Romania's Ionuț Mitrea and Bogdan Mada for fourth place by ten seconds, in the B-final of the men's K-2 200 metres, clocking at 36.336 seconds.

References

External links
 
NBC Olympics Profile

1987 births
Belgian male canoeists
Living people
Olympic canoeists of Belgium
Canoeists at the 2012 Summer Olympics
Sportspeople from Mechelen